Husasău may refer to one of two places in Bihor County, Romania:

Husasău de Tinca, a commune
 Husasău de Criş, a village in Ineu Commune